Alberto Marsicano (31 January 1952 – 18 August 2013) was a Brazilian musician, translator, writer, philosopher and professor.  He was one of the people who introduced the Indian sitar in Brazil. He played with musicians such as Ivan Vilela, Lula Côrtes and Arnaldo Antunes.

Marsicano spoke many languages, including Chinese, Latin, English, and Greek. He had a degree in philosophy.

He studied with Ravi Shankar in London, and Krishna Chakavarty, a professor at the University of Benares.

Discography 
 Electric Sitar (2003)
 Eter (Edson X-Mix) (2003)
 Quintissencia (2002)
 Raga Do Cerrado (2001)
 Impressionismos (1995)

References

1952 births
2013 deaths
Musicians from São Paulo
Sitar players
Brazilian translators
20th-century translators